Joseph Brady (9 October 1928 – 12 June 2001) was a Scottish actor. He starred in a number of television shows, notably as PC Jock Weir in Z-Cars (1962–67, returning for a cameo in the final episode in 1978), as Kenny McBlane in the third series of The Fall and Rise of Reginald Perrin (1978–79) and as Gramps in the 1993 Rab C. Nesbitt episode "Right".

He also made appearances in films such as The Fourth Protocol and played the part of the ship's purser in Brideshead Revisited.

Filmography

References

External links
 

1928 births
2001 deaths
Male actors from Glasgow
Scottish male film actors
Scottish male television actors